Wilhelm Christian Benecke von Gröditzberg (12 December 1779 - 4 June 1860), né Wilhelm Christian Benecke, was a German banker, merchant, estate owner and art collector. He was ennobled in 1829 as Benecke von Gröditzberg, after he had bought the fief Gröditzberg including a baroque palace and medieval Castle Gröditzberg  (now: Grodziec) in Silesia.

Wilhelm Christian Benecke  was born in Frankfurt an der Oder, Germany. In partnership with Norwegian industrialist, Benjamin Wegner, he  bought Blaafarveværket at Åmot in Modum in Buskerud, Norway during 1822.  The mining and industrial company Blaafarveværket had been founded in 1773 to extract cobalt from the mines at Modum, Norway .

References

Bibliography
Wernicke, Ewald (1880)  Groeditzberg: Geschichte und Beschreibung der Burg
Kindingstad, Torbjørn (2002)   Norges oljehistorie (Stavanger: Wigestrand)

Further reading
 Wilhelm Christian Benecke von Gröditzberg: Erinnerungen aus meinem Leben, besonders meine merkantilischen Verhältnisse betreffend, für meine Nachkommen und Erben, Gröditzberg, den 11. Februar 1851. Manuskript, Schreibmaschinen-Transkript um 1920.
 Auktionskatalog Th. Müller, Berlin 1861, Auktionskatalog Rudolf Lepke, Berlin 1876.
 Staatliche Museen zu Berlin, Dokumentation der Verluste Bd.II, Berlin 2001, S. 20.
 Schlesische Kunstsammlungen, Wilhelm Christian Benecke von Gröditzberg (1779–1860).

External links

Castle Grodziec website

German bankers
1779 births
1860 deaths
People from Frankfurt (Oder)